Siran Samuel (born: 1997) is a South Sudanese beauty pageant titleholder who was crowned as Beauties of South Sudan 2014 and was dethroned by CEO Atong Demach and South Sudan's representative in Miss Earth 2015. Samuel was supposed to compete in Miss Earth 2014 but Beauties of South Sudan, the license owner of Miss Earth in South Sudan, decided to withdraw for unprecedented circumstances that were out of their control, and would resume their participation the following year (2015).

Pageantry

Beauties of South Sudan 2014
The second edition of Beauties of South Sudan was held at Freedom Hall in Juba, South Sudan on July 13, 2014. Siran was hailed as the top winner together with Sarah Gabrial and Akan William as runner up and winners  of Miss International and Miss Grand South Sudan, respectively. Siran Samuel will now to represent South Sudan in an International pageant yet to be announce for by her manager Miss Atong Demach who was Miss World Africa 2012 and Miss World 3rd runner up. Beauties of South Sudan competition was composed of ten women from South Sudan ten states including Siran Samuel. Janelee Chaparro, Miss Grand International 2013, was at the event and Miss Earth 2013 was also set to attend along with her runner up and Miss Earth 2012 but due to personal reasons their trip to South Sudan was cancelled.

Miss Grand International 2015
Siran Samuel  represented South Sudan at the Miss Grand International 2015 pageant on October 25, 2015, in Bangkok, Thailand.

References

Living people
1997 births